Forestry Research Institute of Nigeria (FRIN) is the Nigerian Government agency that is responsible for forestry research.  It is headquartered in Jericho Ibadan.

FRIN was established as the Federal Department of Forestry Research in 1954. The Institute’s Decree 35 of 1973 and order establishing Research Institute of 1977 changed the status of the Department to an institute.  It is supervised by the Federal Ministry of Environment, but the only Research Institute of the Ministry. 

FRIN operates the Federal College of Forestry in Ibadan (FEDCOFOR).  It is charged with training and developing Forestry and Agricultural practice. 

FEDCOFOR has six specialized research departments, three support departments. It is a mono-technic institution, offering both the National Diploma (ND) in Forestry technology, Agricultural technology, Wood and Paper technology, Horticulture and landscape technology, Crop production technology and Higher National Diploma (HND) in Forestry technology, Wood and Paper technology, Horticulture and landscape technology, Crop production technology and Agricultural Extension management.

The index herbarium code for the herbarium associated with FRIN is FHI.

Location

References

External links 

Nigeria
Forestry in Nigeria
Agricultural organizations based in Nigeria
Organizations based in Ibadan
1954 establishments in Nigeria